Excellent Cadavers is a 1999 television film directed by Ricky Tognazzi.

The film is based on the book with the same name by Alexander Stille and tells the real life events of judge Giovanni Falcone. It was filmed in Palermo and Rome.

The TV movie was broadcast by HBO October 16, 1999.

Plot

Cast 
Chazz Palminteri as Giovanni Falcone
F. Murray Abraham as Tommaso Buscetta
Tony Sperandeo as Stefano Bontate
Anna Galiena as Francesca Morvillo
Andy Luotto as Paolo Borsellino
Lina Sastri as Agnese Borsellino
Arnoldo Foà as Judge Antonino Caponnetto
Ivo Garrani as Judge Gaetano Costa
Gianmarco Tognazzi as Antonino Cassarà
Pierfrancesco Favino as Mario Fabbri
Mattia Sbragia as Judge Quinzi
Francesco Benigno as Giuseppe Greco
Mario Erpichini as Judge Rocco Chinnici
Paolo Paoloni as Salvo Lima
Victor Cavallo as Totò Riina
Giuseppe Cederna as Judge Giuseppe Ayala
Stefano Benassi as Inspector
Bruno Bilotta as Salvatore Inzerillo
Luigi Maria Burruano as Luciano Liggio
Monica Scattini as Francesca's Colleague
Andrea Tidona as Mayor
Riccardo Salvino as Magistrate 
Ricky Tognazzi as Prison Director

References

External links

1999 films
1999 drama films
Films about the Sicilian Mafia
Films set in Italy
HBO Films films
Films directed by Ricky Tognazzi
Films scored by Michael Tavera
Italian drama films
1990s Italian-language films
American drama television films
1990s American films
1990s Italian films